Thomas Moodie may refer to:
 Thomas H. Moodie (1878–1948), North Dakota politician
 Thomas Moodie (Rhodesian settler) (1839–1894), pioneer in Rhodesia

See also
 Thomas Moody (disambiguation)